Shin Megami Tensei: Devil Survivor is a tactical role-playing video game in the Megami Tensei series developed by Atlus for the Nintendo DS. It was released in Japan on January 15, 2009, and in North America on June 23, 2009. An enhanced port for the Nintendo 3DS, Shin Megami Tensei: Devil Survivor Overclocked, was also developed by Atlus and released in 2011 for Japan and North America while in 2013 for Europe.

Devil Survivor is set in modern-day Tokyo and follows a 17-year-old student and his friends, who see an outbreak of demons with some of them becoming their allies. The Protagonist also finds he has the ability to see a person's remaining lifespan and decides to work to avoid as many deaths as possible. Devil Survivor is a tactical role-playing video game where the player and computer control a number of squads composed of one leader and two supporting characters. Between combat, the player can explore several districts in Tokyo to either advance the plot by speaking to specific characters, discover new information, or take part in "free battles". The narrative can branch in multiple ways that result in different endings, which depend upon the player's decisions during critical moments throughout the story.

The game was designed to appeal to newcomers of the genre. It was commercially successful in Japan, selling 106,997 units. Critics praised the storyline and gameplay which allowed for multiple replayability. Overclocked received similar albeit lower critical response based on the addition and lack of improvements to the port. The series received a manga adaptation as well as a drama CD. A sequel, Shin Megami Tensei: Devil Survivor 2, was released in 2011.

Gameplay
Devil Survivor is a tactical role-playing game. The player takes on the role of a young second year high school student. Between combat, the player can explore several districts in Tokyo to either advance the plot by speaking to specific characters, discover new information, or take part in "free battles" that are not story-driven but can be used to improve the party's skills and experience. Certain story-based activities will advance the game's clock by a set amount of time, and may lead to other activities becoming no longer available or creating a new activity. The game's overall story is non-linear, and choices made earlier in the game may affect which characters and battles are available in the latter part of the game. The enhanced version of Devil Survivor for the 3DS features an eighth day, which continues on from four of the six endings.

Each character can be assigned two demons. The player can acquire new demons, up to 24 in total, by attempting to win demon auctions using the macca collected in battle.

Combat

In combat situations, the player takes turns with the computer opponents to defeat enemies and satisfy certain mission objects such as helping innocent characters to escape the field safely, while avoiding conditions that will end the mission in failure. Both the player and computer control a number of squads composed of one leader and two supporting characters. In each turn, a squad can move and attack an enemy, and its individual members can perform one additional action such as healing the squad, buffing their attack, disabling an opposing squad, or for human characters, summoning a new demon to replace an unconscious one. When attacking an enemy, the game allows the player to select one action for each squad member, and the computer doing the same for its squad. Certain actions in combat can gain a specific squad member the ability to perform one additional combat round action after combat resolution, such as striking at an opponent's weakness. While any three members of the opposing squad can be targeted by combat actions, the leader remains strong while either of the two supporting units still retain health. However, if the leader is taken down to zero health, the entire squad becomes disabled even if the two supporting units remain healthy. For the player, they can earn more experience by first removing the supporting squad members before attacking the leader, but can also extend the length of battle and present more of a risk for surviving it. Defeating individual foes in battle gains experience points for the player and their units, and "macca", a form of currency used for the game. Completing a battle can earn additional experience and macca for all of the player's units, and completely revives any fallen units.

The player controls up to four squads, each led by one of the major human characters in the game with summoned demons as their supporting units; most of the enemies faced in the game are either squads of demons or a demon tamer with their own summoned demons. Each unit has up to seven abilities—three active ones that lead to combat actions, three passive ones that affect unit statistics, strengths, and weaknesses, and a final slot for a race-specific behaviors for demons, or for the human characters a means of buffing their squad at the start of a combat round. For demons, new abilities are learned either through leveling up, being trained a new ability by the player after defeating a certain number of enemies, or as a result of "fusion", inheriting the ability from one of the two demons used in the fusion. The player's human characters gain these by "skill cracking" abilities from the demons or other opponents they face; to crack a skill, the player must target a specific skill from a specific unit on the field for each human character before battle, and then defeat that unit with that character's squad. Once cracked, the player can assign these skills across all of their parties' human characters.

Plot

Setting and characters

Devil Survivor is set in modern-day Tokyo which is put in quarantine after a demon outbreak, resulting in the area not having electricity and several people not having access to their homes. The game's protagonist is a 17-year-old student whose name and actions are decided by the player. He is joined by computer hacker Atsuro Kihara and everygirl Yuzu Tanikawa as the group becomes able to summon demons using electronic devices known as COMPs created by the protagonist's cousin, Naoya. The group later joins forces with Keisuke Takagi, Atsuro's school friend who has a strong sense of justice; Midori Komaki, a cosplay idol, personifying her role in protecting the innocent from demons; Eiji "Gin" Kamiya, the manager of a local live music bar; Tadashi "Kaido" Nikaido, the charismatic leader of the street gang, the "Shibuya Daemons"; Mari Mochizuki, an elementary school tutor seeking the demon that killed her lover; Misaki Izuna, a military officer overseeing the quarantine; Amane Kuzuryu, the daughter of the leader of the Shomonkai, a religious cult that seems to be behind the demon outbreak; and Black Frost, a demon that helps other weaker demons from ruthless human attacks after being saved by Midori. Other allies include: Yoshino "Haru" Haruzawa, a singer who believes her song was responsible for the demon outbreak; Yasuyuki Honda, a company man trapped in the quarantine while his son, outside it, is undergoing a serious operation;  and Shoji, a female journalist that had been investigating the events leading to the quarantine before it started.

Story
One day, the Protagonist, finds that he and his two friends, Atsuro Kihara and Yuzu Tanikawa, have been given modified electronic device called COMPs by his older cousin, Naoya. As they are exploring their purpose, an outbreak of demons occurs within Tokyo, and a large area of the city is quarantined by the Japanese Ground Self-Defense Forces, denying power, communications, and food to those trapped within. The chaotic situation gives rise to vigilantes who take it upon themselves to fight the demons or even prey on weaker humans. The Protagonist and his friends discover their COMPs allow them to summon helpful demons to fight the aggressive ones, allowing them to survive the attacks. The Protagonist also finds he has the ability to see a person's "death clock", representing how many days a person will have left to live. While he uses it to help himself and his friends to change their own fate, the protagonist learns from Atsuro's old friend, Keisuke Takagi, that everyone within the quarantine will die within seven days due to unknown circumstances.

As they try to learn the mystery of the lockdown, they encounter several playable character allies. With their help they defeat the threatening demon Beldr. This causes the protagonist to become a part of the War of Bel in order to free the world from the demons making him thus a target for all other Demons that are in competition with him with the seventh day being day in which he will face the next Bel. Through their investigation, the Protagonist and his allies find that the demon outbreak is a result of a planned battle between angels and demons, as a measure to judge the worthiness of mankind. If, after seven days, the demons are not stopped, the angels will destroy mankind. The Japanese government had been aware of this event for years, and had enacted the PSE Law as a safeguard, which embedded remote-controlled electromagnetic devices in every consumer electronics; if the demons outbreak cannot be stopped, the government can use these devices at the last moment to destroy all living things within the quarantine, human and demon alike.

In the fifth day, the gang meets Naoya who reveals his intentions for his cousin to win the Throne of Bel. It is also revealed he worked with the Shomonkai to create the programs to summon demons as to bring about this event, initially through the keyboard used by Aya, one of Haru's band members. The Shomonkai sought to bring the king of demons Belberith to the world in order for the demons to win the battle, and Naoya required the Protagonist and his friends to survive long enough for this event to happen. Depending on the path players take, the Protagonist comes to learn that Naoya and himself are the reincarnations of the biblical Cain and Abel, respectively which is why the Protagonist can become the new Messiah.

Numerous choices made by the player will affect his friends and allies, and there are several endings to the game. Preventing the demon uprising can be accomplished in several ways; if the player follows Amane, he defeats the remaining Bels and takes control of demons in the name of God; if the player follows Naoya, he takes control of demons as the Lord of Bel and declares war on God; if the player follows Atsuro, the party convinces Naoya to reprogram the demon summoning server to allow all of humanity to access demon-based technology, creating a third technological revolution; if the player follows Gin, with the aid of Haru, the party permanently banishes demons from the human realm. The player can also follow Yuzu and break out of the lockdown to save themselves, allowing demons to escape Tokyo and wreak havoc upon the world.

Development 

Shin Megami Tensei: Devil Survivor was published and developed by Atlus, namely by members of the recently acquired developer Career Soft. The game was designed so that newcomers of strategy games would enjoy them. Rather than simplifying the game system, Atlus mixed different gaming elements to create a new fighting system. Battles were designed so that players from previous Megami Tensei games would find it familiar. Features such as the Extra Turns provided by exploiting an enemy's weakness were based on classic Megami Tensei games. The game also reincorporates demons previously seen in the franchise while adding new ones with Kazuma Kaneko being responsible for the one known as Balder. The use of three characters per unit was designed to let the player try different combinations.

Atlus wanted to capture a wider audience with this game. For this they went through a light novel approach while writing its story and hired character designer Suzuhito Yasuda. Although they wanted to make Devil Survivor different from previous Megami Tensei games, the team still wanted to make sure it belonged to the series. They considered the series famous for its dark storytelling and wanted to keep it intact. In order to make the game accessible to followers of the series, they decided to focus more on the demons' development rather than the strategy combat. During development of the game, the staff got positive feedback from the players in that the game still felt like a role-playing game. They found the Nintendo DS to be suitable for Devil Survivor due to its dual screen which would fit simulation games. Their saying when starting development was "Let's breathe new life into the series and really shake things up."

Unlike in the Shin Megami Tensei and Persona series where the players searched for the "correct" answers, Devil Survivor avoids this and has more controversial choices that would motivate the players to replay the game. When asked whether Devil Survivor was inspired by Square Enix's The World Ends with You, Atlus stated that, while it had similarities with The World Ends with Yous seven-day limit and being set in modern-day Japan, a lot of elements found in The World Ends with You have been seen in previous Shin Megami Tensei games.

Its music was composed by Takami Asano (of the band Godiego) which while the Atlus staff found it different from previous game, they believed it fitted the game. Atlus opened a teaser site for Devil Survivor, which revealed both the composer and the illustrator for the game. The game's main theme song is "Reset" performed by Aya Ishihara and the 3DS version's main theme song is "Soul Survive" performed by Junko Minagawa, who also voiced Haru in the Japanese version of Devil Survivor Overclocked and in the Drama CD.

Two original video game soundtracks have been released with Megami Ibunroku Devil Survivor Original Remix Soundtrack being released on January 11, 2009 by Lantis. The soundtrack for Overclocked was released on November 25, 2011.

Remaster 
An enhanced port of the game for the Nintendo 3DS was released in North America on August 23, 2011. Prior to its release, it was announced by Atlus at E3 2010. It was later fully revealed as Shin Megami Tensei: Devil Survivor Overclocked. New features include added plot with an eighth day that further explored the resolution. A compendium is also available, allowing the player to recover lost demons. It also has full voice acting which concerned the staff due to the possibility of 20,000 words worth of voiced dialogue not fitting the cartridge. The game also has the ability to choose different difficulty settings, and more than 150 demons (an increase from the original game, which featured 130 demons). Shin Megami Tensei: Devil Survivor Overclocked was released in North America on August 23, 2011. The game received mostly positive reviews for improved graphics, voice acting and the 8th Day, but criticized for the lack of 3D scenes. Ghostlight released the game in Europe on March 29, 2013.

In the initial European release of Devil Survivor Overclocked, some bugs were prevalent; among these were various game crashes such as after the player summoned a demon during a battle and another crash occurring during the devil auction. Ghostlight, the publisher, made an announcement regarding this on March 31, 2013, and said that they were doing everything they could to fix the problems as soon as possible. On April 24, 2013, Ghostlight announced that a bug-fix patch had passed testing, and was to be submitted to Nintendo for distribution. It was released on May 28, 2013.

A sequel for the Nintendo DS, Devil Survivor 2, was announced by Famitsu in March 2011. It was released in Japan on July 28, 2011, with a North American release on February 28, 2012. Once again, character designs are handled by Suzuhito Yasuda with monsters designed by Mohiro Kitoh.

The 8th Day
The 8th Day is a new chapter set after the events of the original Devil Survivor, expanding on three of the original game's endings. In Yuzu's 8th Day, the Protagonist, Yuzu, and Atsuro escape the lockdown only to discover the SDF has branded them terrorists and taken their families into custody. In order to clear their names, they return to the lockdown and agree to work with the SDF special forces in clearing out the remaining demons and destroying the Shomonkai's god, Belberith. If the player undertakes a sidequest to restore the barrier separating the human and demon worlds, the demon invasion is ended; otherwise, demons continue to invade the world.

In Naoya's 8th Day, the Protagonist learns that Metatron is holding Tokyo hostage and extending the lockdown, forcing the remaining demon tamers to kill the new Overlord. If the Protagonist chooses to avoid killing the demon tamers, the people in the lockdown will gradually see the angels as their true enemy. This culminates in Yuzu, Amane, and Captain Izuna rallying the people in the Yamanote Circle behind the Overlord in opposition to God's tyranny. After defeating Metatron, the Protagonist soon leaves to rally the demons in a war against the Heavenly Host. If the Protagonist chooses to kill both the demon tamers and angels that get in his way, he soon becomes feared by the humans in the lockdown. This results in Yuzu and Midori allying with Metatron in an attempt to stop him. Once he is defeated, the Overlord soon extends his power to Japan and soon the rest of the human world, gradually uniting them as a single nation under his despotic rule before waging war against YHWH Himself.

In Amane's 8th Day, the Protagonist attempts to guide the people of the lockdown to salvation. This provokes Okuninushi, the Creator of Japan, into resisting the Messiah's influence by empowering demon tamers. He issues an ultimatum: the Messiah must guide the first murderer Cain/Naoya, into salvation or else he will destroy Japan and recreate it anew. Attempting to reach out to Naoya, the Protagonist forgives him for the original murder and tries to convince him to repent. Naoya arrives to help the party in the battle against Okuninushi by placing a barrier to prevent him from resurrecting himself. Upon defeat, Okuninushi agrees to abdicate Japan to the Messiah.

Related media 
A drama CD for the game was released on August 26, 2009 by Geneonuniversal. It acts as an abridged digest of the events of the game.

The manga adaptation of Devil Survivor was first announced in May 2012. It started serialization in Kodansha's Monthly Shonen Sirius magazine. The story and artwork is handled by Satoru Matsuba. Its first tankōbon volume was released on April 9, 2013 and as of November 8, 2013, three volumes were released.

Reception 

The game received positive critical reception with an average of 84 in Metacritic. Considered a "welcome addition" to the Shin Megami Tensei series by GameZone, Devil Survivor was praised for its unique battle system, storyline, and general art style compared to other games in the general RPG genre and the tactical RPG genre. GamePro praised the additions of features often seen in the Vandal Hearts and Disgaea such as implementing grid-based battles as a departure from the Shin Megami Tensei series but noted the combat was not "incredibly deep." As a result, the combat system was one of the main focus of criticisms by GamePro. 1UP.com noted that although the game was often compared with Square Enix's The World Ends with You released the previous year, the games are only similar through Devil Survivor first hour and that it was a common tradition in the Megami Tensei to feature these types of stories that were compared with Square's game.

The overall art style was generally praised, mostly for the monsters and demons "polished and full of subtle style". Also widely praised was the storyline and its six alternate endings, which allow for replayability. Although having innumerable biblical and mythological references and an abnormally large amount of text, it has a solid storyline that is able to keep players engaged. The music was a "hit or miss, depending on your tastes" by GameZone, while RPGamer found it decent despite not being as appealing as previous Megami Tensei soundtracks. Reviews, like IGN, noted that the game has a "whole lot of depth, all of which fuse together to create one of the best RPGs of the year thus far." The game was also a nominee in GameSpot's 2009 Best Genre Awards in the role-playing game category.

Shin Megami Tensei: Devil Survivor Overclocked received a positive review by GamesRadar for its improved graphics, the inclusion voice acting and the 8th Day, but it was also criticized for the lack of 3D scenes. NintendoLife commented that while the port does not offer several new features, it still remained as an appealing game and called it "one of the heftier 3DS games out there too, with multiple endings and tons of content to explore". RPGamer found most of the voice acting to be appealing despite few actors that might annoy players. The 8th Day was seen as one of the Overclocked most attractive features for expanding on the game story, and adding a new boss. In general, the average score of Overclocked was sightly lower than the original with an average of 78 in Metacritic.

During its first week in Japan, Devil Survivor sold a total of 55,466 units ranking as the third bestselling game. Another 18,260 units were sold in the last week of January 2009. In 2009, it shipped a total of 106,997 units, becoming the 112th best selling game from Japan. On the other hand, sales in the west were lower with IGN reporting the game sold 40,000 copies as of September 2009. Overclock sold 21,809 copies in its first week of release in Japan. By the end of the year it reached a total of 39,801 units sold.

Legacy
The game received a 2011 sequel named Shin Megami Tensei: Devil Survivor 2 for the Nintendo DS which tells the story of Japanese high school students who received an email from a website foretelling deaths and use them to control demons and fight fate across Japan.

References

External links 
 Official website 
 Official 3DS website

2009 video games
Atlus games
Devil Survivor
Nintendo 3DS eShop games
Nintendo 3DS games
Nintendo DS games
Role-playing video games
Single-player video games
Video games about angels
Video games about cults
Video games about demons
Video games developed in Japan
Video games set in Japan
Video games set in Tokyo
Career Soft games
Ghostlight games